The following articles contain lists of nebulae:

List of dark nebulae
List of diffuse nebulae
List of planetary nebulae
List of protoplanetary nebulae
List of supernova remnants

See also
 Lists of astronomical objects